James Anthony Brown OBE (born 5 January 1950) is a Manx politician, former businessman and electrician who was the Chief Minister of the Isle of Man from 2006 until October 2011, when he stepped down from office following his decision to retire.

Early life and career
Born on 5 January 1950, Brown was educated at Victoria Road Primary, Castletown and Castle Rushen High School and has since been an electrician, being the proprietor of Tony Brown Electrics in Castletown until its closure in 2010. He was elected as a member of Castletown Commissioners in 1976, becoming Chairman in 1980 before being elected as the Castletown MHK in 1981 at his first attempt. In 2000, he was defeated in his attempt to become Speaker of the House of Keys by David Cannan but instead became the Deputy Speaker.  Following the 2001 General Election, he was elected Speaker and in January 2002, Deputy President of Tynwald.

He was re-elected in November 2006 as MHK, beating Roy Redmayne by 915 votes to 335. He was again elected Speaker of the House of Keys after the General Election in 2006. There was a great deal of rumour that he might run for Chief Minister, but when nominations were put forward his name was not on the list. Then followed an unsuccessful round of voting with neither Steve Rodan, John Shimmin nor David Cannan being elected. Nominations then reopened, with Tony Brown being the only candidate put forward. His nomination was confirmed by Tynwald on Thursday, 14 December 2006 receiving 27 votes and the Lieutenant Governor appointed him Chief Minister later in the day.  He then resigned the Speakership of the House of Keys as required by law.

Brown was appointed Officer of the Order of the British Empire (OBE) in the 2013 Birthday Honours for public and political service.

Personal life
Brown has been married to Rachel (née Smith) since 1979, they have 2 children together and live in Brown's hometown of Castletown.

Governmental positions
Minister of Health and Social Security, 1986–89
Minister of Local Government and the Environment, 1989–94
Minister of Tourism and Leisure, 1994–96
Minister of Transport, 1996–2001
Chief Minister, 2006–11

Brown Council

References

1950 births
Living people
Chief Ministers of the Isle of Man
Manx businesspeople
Members of the House of Keys 1981–1986
Members of the House of Keys 1986–1991
Members of the House of Keys 1991–1996
Members of the House of Keys 1996–2001
Members of the House of Keys 2001–2006
Members of the House of Keys 2006–2011
Officers of the Order of the British Empire